The 1997 Stella Artois Championships was a men's tennis tournament played on grass courts at the Queen's Club in London in the United Kingdom and was part of the World Series of the 1997 ATP Tour. It was the 95th edition of the tournament and was held from 9 June through 15 June 1997. Mark Philippoussis won the singles title.

Finals

Singles

 Mark Philippoussis defeated  Goran Ivanišević 7–5, 6–3
 It was Philippoussis' 3rd title of the year and the 6th of his career.

Doubles

 Mark Philippoussis /  Patrick Rafter defeated  Sandon Stolle /  Cyril Suk 6–2, 4–6, 7–5
 It was Philippoussis' 4th title of the year and the 7th of his career. It was Rafter's 2nd title of the year and the 6th of his career.

References

External links
 Official website
 ATP tournament profile

 
Stella Artois Championships
Queen's Club Championships
Stella Artois Championships
Stella Artois Championships
Stella Artois Championships